The Nigeria Super 4 is an annual preseason competition that involves teams that will be representing Nigeria in CAF Champions League and CAF Confederations Cup. The teams to participate are normally the first and second positions from the FA Cup and Nigerian Premier League, although age-grade national teams have also competed once in the past. Four teams usually compete, hence it is called the "Super 4".

Finals

Notes

References 

National association football supercups
Football competitions in Nigeria